Peter O'Donohue (14 June 1923 – 4 November 2012) was an Australian rules footballer who played for Hawthorn in the VFL during the 1940s.

O'Donohue usually played in defence or in the centre and played 109 games with Hawthorn. He was made captain during the 1950 season and kept that position until the end of 1952. His time at Hawthorn was interrupted by his service in the Royal Australian Navy during World War II.

In 1953 he went to Western Australia, where he became captain coach of West Perth for two seasons. O'Donohue's job with the CSIRO led him to accept an appointment to coach Deniliquin in the Murray Football League. He led Deniliquin to the 1957 premiership playing as a half back flanker.
He returned to Hawthorn in 1966 as coach, but it was his only season in charge.

Peter went on to be a highly successful amateur coach in the Victorian Amateur Football Association (VAFA), earning life membership of the VAFA in 2002.

Honours and achievements
Individual
 Hawthorn captain: 1952
 Hawthorn life member

References

External links

Peter O'Donohue's playing statistics from WAFL Footy Facts

1923 births
Australian rules footballers from Victoria (Australia)
Hawthorn Football Club players
Hawthorn Football Club coaches
West Perth Football Club players
West Perth Football Club coaches
Northcote Football Club coaches
Deniliquin Football Club players
2012 deaths